This is a list of schools at all levels founded by the Marist Brothers. The Marist Brothers is a religious institute founded by St. Marcellin Champagnat, with more than 3,500 Catholic Brothers dedicated "to make Jesus Christ known and loved through the education of young people, especially those most neglected".

References

 
Marist Brothers